J. Alexander (8 August 1938 – 14 January 2022) was an Indian bureaucrat and politician who served as Chief Secretary and Cabinet Minister, Karnataka State, India.

Early life 
Alexander was born in Mangad, in Kollam District of Kerala State on 8 August 1938 in a middle-class family; one out of seven children of John Joseph and Elizabeth Joseph. His early education was in Kollam until he finished B.A in English Language and Literature. He did his M.A in English Literature from University College, Trivandrum and did his Ph.D in Philosophy from Karnataka University.

Career 
He started his career as a lecturer in English in Fatima Mata National College, Kollam and joined the Indian Administrative Service in 1963, where he was allotted to Karnataka State IAS cadre. 

He served for 33 years in various departments as District Commissioner and District Magistrate of Dharwad District, Karnataka, Revenue Commissioner of Karnataka State and  Chairman, Karnataka State Revenue Appellate Tribunal, Commissioner and Chief Executive of Bangalore City Municipal Corporation. chairman of the   Bangalore Development Authority, Bangalore Water Supply and Sewerage Board, Karnataka state Urban water supply and sewerage Board, Slum Clearance Board, and housing Board.

He was also Chief Executive of Karnataka State Road Transport Corporation,  Chairman and Managing Director, Mangalore Chemicals & Fertilizers, Mangalore, and chairman of several other enterprises. Finally, he was Chief Secretary of the State of Karnataka.

After retirement from the civil service, he joined the Indian National Congress, and contested elections to the Karnataka Legislative Assembly. He became a member of the Legislative Assembly from Bharathi Nagar (presently Sarvagnanagar) Constituency, Bangalore and became a Cabinet Minister for Tourism in S. M. Krishna Ministry of Karnataka State. Later, he became Vice President of Karnataka Pradesh Congress Committee, Karnataka. He left the Indian National Congress in 2019, claiming that the party neglected Christians. However, he stayed on after being convinced by senior leaders.

He served as President of Bangalore City YMCA for more than 30 years. He was also Advisory Board member in Global Organization of People of Indian Origin(GOPIO), Board of governors of Xavier Institute of Management and Entrepreneurship Bangalore and Chairman of its branch in KOCHI, Kerala.

Personal life and death 
Alexander was married to Delfin Alexander, with whom he had two sons. He died from a heart attack at a hospital in Bangalore, on 14 January 2022, at the age of 83.

References

1938 births
2022 deaths
People from Kollam district
Indian Administrative Service officers
Malayali politicians
Karnataka MLAs 1999–2004
University College Thiruvananthapuram alumni
Karnatak University alumni